Fire Station No. 1 is a historic fire station located at Muncie, Delaware County, Indiana. It was built in 1913, and is a two-story, flat roofed building with restrained Classical Revival style detailing.  It is faced with buff brick, has alternating rusticated and dressed limestone banding, and a brick parapet.  The first floor has three garage bays.

It was added to the National Register of Historic Places in 1989.

On 1 October 2017, it was announced that approximately $100,000 would be invested in floor repairs to enable a firetruck to return to service from the location.

References

Fire stations on the National Register of Historic Places in Indiana
Neoclassical architecture in Indiana
Fire stations completed in 1913
Buildings and structures in Muncie, Indiana
National Register of Historic Places in Muncie, Indiana
1913 establishments in Indiana